Keith G Haward (born 28 June 1951) is a male retired British wrestler. Haward competed in the men's freestyle 74 kg at the 1976 Summer Olympics. He represented England and won a bronze medal in the 74kg welterweight division, at the 1978 Commonwealth Games in Edmonton, Alberta, Canada.

References

1951 births
Living people
British male sport wrestlers
Olympic wrestlers of Great Britain
Wrestlers at the 1976 Summer Olympics
Wrestlers at the 1978 Commonwealth Games
Commonwealth Games bronze medallists for England
Commonwealth Games medallists in wrestling
Medallists at the 1978 Commonwealth Games